The 1959 Kansas State Wildcats football team represented Kansas State University in the 1959 NCAA University Division football season.  The team's head football coach was Bus Mertes, in his last year at K-State.  The Wildcats played their home games in Memorial Stadium.  1959 saw the Wildcats finish with a record of 2–8, and a 1–5 record in Big Seven Conference play.  The Wildcats scored only 58 points while giving up 232.  The finished seventh in the Big Seven.

Schedule

References

Kansas State
Kansas State Wildcats football seasons
Kansas State Wildcats football